Moerisiidae is a family of cnidarians belonging to the order Anthoathecata.

Genera:
 Halmomises von Kennel, 1891
 Moerisia Boulenger, 1908
 Odessia Paspalew, 1937

References

 
Capitata
Cnidarian families